Gobernador Gordillo Airport , also known as Chamical Airport, is an airport serving Chamical, La Rioja, Argentina.

See also 

 List of airports in Argentina

References

External links 
 

Airports in Argentina